The Southern Cameroons Defence Forces (commonly referred to as SOCADEF) is the armed wing of the African People's Liberation Movement, an Ambazonian separatist movement. It is led by Ebenezer Akwanga, who is based in the United States, and its ground forces were commanded by General Andrew Ngoe. Together with the Ambazonia Defence Forces, it is one of the most prominent militias fighting in the Anglophone Crisis.

SOCADEF has not joined the Ambazonia Self-Defence Council, an umbrella organization created by the Interim Government. However, its political wing, the African People's Liberation Movement (APLM), took part in forming the Southern Cameroons Liberation Council in March 2019, effectively uniting with the Interim Government under an umbrella organization.

On January 24, 2019, General Andrew Ngoe was killed in Matoh, Mbonge, leaving "General Opobo" in charge. The militia made some headlines in March 2020 when it declared a two-week ceasefire to give people time to get tested for coronavirus. General Opobo was captured and killed by other separatists in June 2021, and SOCADEF was rumored to have disbanded. In reality, the militia went underground for several months while acquiring better weapons and a new leadership. In September 2021, SOCADEF resurfaced with a new leader known as "General Jason".

References 

 

Military of Ambazonia
National liberation movements in Africa
Secessionist organizations